Fadi El Khatib (born January 1, 1979), nicknamed "the Lebanese Tiger", is a Lebanese professional basketball player for Sagesse SC of the Lebanese Basketball League. El Khatib played for several teams in the Lebanese Basketball League, and also played abroad in Syria, Ukraine and China. He was also a member of the Lebanon national team that finished runners-up in the FIBA Asia Championship three times, in 2001, 2005 and 2007. El Khatib also participated in the FIBA World Championship in 2002, 2006 and 2010.

Professional career
El Khatib began playing professionally in 1997, aged 17, at Sagesse, staying with them until 2004. He then moved for one year to Al-Ittihad Aleppo in Syria, before moving back to Sagesse in 2006. With Sagesse, El Khatib won seven Lebanese Basketball League titles, two Arab Club titles, and three FIBA Asia Champions Cup titles.

Throughout his career, El Khatib also played for other Lebanese Basketball League teams such as Al Riyadi Beirut, Champville, Amchit, and Homenetmen Beirut. Between 2015 and 2017, he played in China for Foshan Long Lions and Fujian Sturgeons. El Khatib then returned to Champville in 2017, playing there until his retirement in 2020. In August 2022, El Khatib announced his return to Sagesse Club in a big announcement held in Hotel Le Gabriel Achrafieh in which attended his former coach Ghassan Sarkis and former teammate Elie Mechantaf.

National team career
In 1999, El Khatib made his debut for the Lebanon national team at the 1999 ABC Championship; Lebanon reached the quarter-finals and finished in seventh place. At the 2001 ABC Championship, El Khatib led Lebanon to a second-place finish; he was named to the 2001 FIBA Asia All-Star Five. With the runners-up finish, Lebanon qualified to the 2002 FIBA World Championship; despite Lebanon losing in the first round, El Khatib finished the tournament among the top ten scorers, with an average of 17.6 points per game.

At the 2005 FIBA Asia Championship, El Khatib averaged 23.0 points per game, and helped Lebanon to reach the final; once again, Lebanon qualified to the 2006 FIBA World Championship. He scored 35 points in the opener against Venezuela, and 29 in a 74–73 win against France. Despite the two wins, Lebanon fell short of qualifying to the round of 16. El Khatib led Lebanon to a third runners-up finish at the 2007 FIBA Asia Championship; he averaged 28.4 points per game throughout the tournament, but lost to Iran 74–69 in the final.

El Khatib eventually participated with Lebanon at the Asia Championship in 2009 and at the World Championship in 2010. He would not participate for Lebanon until 2017, playing his last national-team games at the 2017 FIBA Asia Cup.

Personal life
In July 2020, El Khatib obtained Turkish citizenship by investment in the country. His son, Jihad El Khatib, joined Turkish club Fenerbahçe in October 2020.

Awards and honours
Domestic club
 11x Lebanese Basketball League champion: 1998, 1999, 2000, 2001, 2002, 2003, 2004, 2009, 2012, 2015, 2016
 8x Lebanese Basketball Cup champion: 1995, 1997, 1998, 1999, 2000, 2001, 2002, 2003
 3x Lebanese Basketball League Best Domestic Player: 2006, 2009, 2010
 4x Lebanese Basketball League All Tournament Team: 2004, 2006, 2007, 2010
 4x Lebanese Basketball League Player of the year: 2001, 2002, 2003, 2004
 Lebanese Basketball League Forward of the year: 2007
 Lebanese Basketball League scoring leader: 2010
 Syrian Basketball League regular season champion: 2005

International club
 4x FIBA Asia Champions Cup champion: 1999, 2000, 2004, 2011
 2x FIBA Asia Champions Cup MVP: 2005, 2011
 2x FIBA Asia Champions Cup All-Star Team: 2005, 2011
 3x Arab Club Basketball Championship champion: 1998, 1999, 2010
 Arab Club Basketball Championship All-Star Team: 2010
 Arab Club Basketball Championship Best Domestic Player: 2010

National team
 3x FIBA Asia Championship Silver Medal winner: 2001, 2005, 2007
 2x FIBA Asia Championship All-Star Team: 2001, 2005
 FIBA Asia Championship Best Forward: 2005
 FIBA Asia Stankovic Cup winner: 2010
 2x WABA Championship champion: 2000
 West Asia MVP: 2001, 2002
 Efes Pilsen World Cup 9 Bronze Medal winner: 2010

References

External links
 Player profile at www.InterBasket.net
 Player profile at www.Asia-Basket.com (subscription required)
 Asian Legends series at FIBA.com

1979 births
Living people
People from Chouf District
Lebanese men's basketball players
Small forwards
Sagesse SC basketball players
BC Cherkaski Mavpy players
Al Riyadi Club Beirut basketball players
Guangzhou Loong Lions players
Fujian Sturgeons players
2002 FIBA World Championship players
2006 FIBA World Championship players
2010 FIBA World Championship players
Asian Games competitors for Lebanon
Basketball players at the 2006 Asian Games
Lebanese expatriate basketball people in Syria
Lebanese expatriate basketball people in Ukraine
Lebanese expatriate basketball people in China
Naturalized citizens of Turkey